Hybomitra solstitialis  is a Palearctic species of horse fly in the family Tabanidae. 
Continental authorities apply the name solstitialis to the coastal species Hybomitra ciureai of British authorities and regard British solstitialis as var. collini of Hybomitra bimaculata.

References

External links
Images representing Hybomitra solstialis
Martin C. Harvey , 2018 Key to genus Hybomitra

Tabanidae
Diptera of Europe
Taxa named by Johann Wilhelm Meigen
Insects described in 1820